Ubaldo Terzani Horror Show is a 2010 horror film written and directed  by Gabriele Albanesi and starring Paolo Sassanelli and Giuseppe Soleri.

Cast

See also 
 List of Italian films of 2010

References

External links 
 
 
2010 horror films
2010 films
Italian horror films
2010s Italian films